The Brisson River (French: Rivière Brisson) flows in the Réserve faunique Duchénier and in the municipality of Esprit-Saint, in the Rimouski-Neigette Regional County Municipality, in the administrative region of Bas-Saint-Laurent, in the province of Quebec, in Canada.

This river flows on the north bank of the Grand Touradi River which flows northeast to the south bank of the Rimouski River; the latter flows west, then north, to the south shore of the St. Lawrence River where it pours into the heart of the city of Rimouski.

Geography 

The Brisso river "rises at the mouth of Chasseur lake, in the Duchénier Wildlife Reserve, in the Notre Dame Mountains. This lake is fed by the outlet of Lac Ovale and is located in the heart of the Duchénier Wildlife Reserve.

  south, in the Duchénier Wildlife Reserve, to a stream (coming from the west);
  southwards, to a stream (coming from the south-west);
  southwards, to the limit of the municipality of Esprit-Saint;
  south-east, to the outlet of Lac Hélène (coming from the north);
  towards the south-east, forming a curve towards the west, up to the confluence of the river.

The Brisson river flows on the north bank of the Grand Touradi River which constitutes the southern limit of the Duchénier Wildlife Reserve.

Toponymy 

The toponym "Rivière Brisson" was formalized on June 11, 1982, at the Commission de toponymie du Québec.

See also 

 List of rivers of Quebec

References 

Rivers of Bas-Saint-Laurent
Rimouski-Neigette Regional County Municipality